{{Automatic taxobox
| image = Malay_Archipelago_horned_flies.jpg
| image_caption = P. cervicornis, P. wallecia, P. brevicornis, P. alcicornis
| display_parents = 2
| taxon = Phytalmia
| authority = Gerstaecker, 1860
| subdivision_ranks = Species
| subdivision = 
| synonyms = * Archiphytalmia Enderlein, 1936
 Elaphomyia Saunders, 1861
}}Phytalmia'' is a genus of tephritid or fruit flies in the family Tephritidae. The males of some species are noted for their hornlike projections on their heads, which are used for fighting.

References

Phytalmiinae
Tephritidae genera
Taxa named by Carl Eduard Adolph Gerstaecker